Árpád stripes is the name of a particular heraldic and vexillologic configuration which has been in constant use since the early 13th century in particular in Hungarian heraldry. It can be seen in the left half of the current coat of arms of Hungary.

They have been associated with the founding dynasty of Hungary, with the House of Árpád, hence the name, but most later rulers and dynasties of Hungary adopted them in one form or another to stress their legitimacy to the Hungarian throne, e.g. by marshalling. The four silver stripes (often depicted as white) are sometimes claimed to symbolise "the four silver rivers" of Hungary—the Danube, Tisza, Sava and Drava. 

The Árpád stripes are heraldically "barry of eight gules and argent".

In heraldry 

The first depiction of the Árpád stripes appear on a coat of arms in 1202 in the seal of King Emeric of Hungary, member of the Árpád Dynasty, though a debated striped banner makes its appearance already on silver coins minted by Stephen I. roughly two centuries earlier. It has ever since formed part of the coat of arms of the ruling dynasties of Hungary and of the coat of arms of the Hungarian state, most of the time, as it does today, impaling gules, on a mount vert a crown Or, issuant therefrom a double cross argent or marshalled with the Angevins’ azure, semé-de-lis Or.

The Árpád stripes appear in many coat of arms of cities of the former Kingdom of Hungary, many of them now in the neighbouring countries of Hungary, such as Košice (Slovakia).

The modern heraldic use of the Árpád stripes is featured in the seal of the National Security Office of Hungary since 2001.

In vexillology 

The famous depiction of a banner with Árpád stripes showing King Béla III in one of the initials of the Chronicon Pictum dates to around 1360. The illustrations and decorative illuminations of the chronicle use the Árpád stripes on several occasion on banners (beside the mentioned initial it appears e.g. in the depiction of the Battle of Ménfő), shields, coat of arms (mostly marshalled with the Hungarian Apostolic Double Cross or the Angevin field azure semé-de-lis) or as the pattern of garment of Stephen I.

However, after the Middle Ages the use of the Árpád stripes as a flag fell out of use and was continued only in heraldry. It was revived only by the cavalry of Prince Francis II Rákóczi.

Today the banner of the House of Árpád as well as the banner of the cavalry of Francis II Rákóczi are part of the collection of historical flags of Hungary used for protocol (e.g. on state celebrations and holidays, MPs are sworn in on them in the Parliament, etc.).

Lately the flag has been adopted by the far-right (most eminently among supporters of Jobbik party) with increasing popularity since the 2006 protests in Hungary.

Controversy 

The recent use of the Árpád stripes both on flags and badges by Hungarian right wing elements have generated controversy, as the Nazi puppet government formed by members of the Hungarian Arrow Cross Party, which was in place for seven months (October 1944–April 1945), used a similar symbol as a component of their flag in the 1940s. Although the stripes have centuries old historical origins, there are claims that the Árpád stripes have fascist connotations.

Defendants claim that they do not foster the memory of the Arrow Cross Party, but rather the rich historical heritage of Hungary and honour the founding dynasty of the Árpáds by bearing this flag. Additionally, they point to the major heraldic difference between the Árpád stripes and the configuration used by the Arrow Cross Party: the Árpád stripes have been defined since the late 19th (before that the number was volatile) century as a barry of eight, such starting with gules and ending with argent, contrasting with the use of the colours by the Hungarian fascists who used nine rather than eight stripes starting and ending with red.

Historical use

Current official use 

Flag|Heraldry